Andzhiyevsky is an urban locality (urban-type settlement) under the administrative jurisdiction of the town of krai significance of Mineralnye Vody of Stavropol Krai, Russia. Population:

References

Notes

Sources

Urban-type settlements in Stavropol Krai